Silveira is a Portuguese language surname. Notable people with the surname include:

Abraham Patusca da Silveira (1905–1990), Brazilian football striker
Alcides Silveira (1938–2011), Uruguayan international football player and coach of the Uruguay national football team
Amarildo Tavares da Silveira (1901–?), Brazilian football striker
Caue Fernandes Silveira (born 1988), Brazilian footballer
Fabio Trinidade da Silveira (born 1977), Brazilian footballer commonly known as Fabinho
Francisco Silveira, Count of Amarante (1763–1821), Portuguese army lieutenant general who fought in the Napoleonic Wars
Gonçalo da Silveira (1526–1561), Portuguese Jesuit missionary in southern Africa
Hugo Silveira, Uruguayan footballer who plays for Tigre
Juan Silveira dos Santos (born 1979), Brazilian footballer commonly known as Juan
Juliana Silveira (born 1980), Brazilian actress and singer
Julio Silveira (born 1953), Uruguayan politician
Larry Silveira (born 1965), American golfer
Leandro Hercílio Carvalho da Silveira (born 1983), Brazilian footballer
Leonor Silveira (born 1970), Portuguese actress
Lucas Silveira (born 1974), Canadian vocalist/guitarist and songwriter for the rock band The Cliks
Lucas Silveira (Brazilian singer) (born 1983), lead vocalist, guitarist and songwriter for the Brazilian emocore band Fresno
Luís Henrique Silveira (born 1979), Brazilian football left back
Luis Miguel Silveira, Portuguese engineer
Maria do Carmo Silveira (born 1960?), former Prime Minister of São Tomé and Príncipe
Martim Mércio da Silveira (1911–1972), Brazilian footballer
Nacimento Silveira (born 1981), Indian footballer
Onésimo Silveira (1935–2021), Cape Verdean politician and writer
Regina Silveira (born 1939), Brazilian artist
Sebastião da Silveira Cintra (1882–1942), Brazilian Roman Catholic cardinal

Portuguese-language surnames